Masbate's 3rd congressional district is one of the three congressional districts of the Philippines in the province of Masbate. It has been represented in the House of Representatives since 1987. The district encompasses the eastern half of Masbate Island consisting of the municipalities of Cataingan, Cawayan, Dimasalang, Esperanza, Palanas, Pio V. Corpuz, Placer and Uson. It is currently represented in the 18th Congress by Wilton T. Kho of the PDP–Laban.

Representation history

Election results

2019

2016

2013

2010

See also
Legislative districts of Masbate

References

Congressional districts of the Philippines
Politics of Masbate
1987 establishments in the Philippines
Congressional districts of the Bicol Region
Constituencies established in 1987